Bosaro is a comune (municipality) in the Province of Rovigo in the Italian region Veneto, located about  southwest of Venice and about  south of Rovigo. 
 
Bosaro borders the following municipalities: Arquà Polesine, Guarda Veneta, Polesella, Pontecchio Polesine, Rovigo.

References

Cities and towns in Veneto